Alien Worlds is  an American science fiction anthology comic that was published by Pacific Comics and, later, Eclipse Comics, in the early 1980s. It was edited by Bruce Jones and April Campbell.

Publication history
Alien Worlds was published on a bi-monthly schedule by Pacific Comics from December 1982 to April 1984 (eight issues, including an offshoot Three Dimensional Alien Worlds published in July 1984). After Pacific went bankrupt, two final issues were published by Eclipse Comics in November 1984 and January 1985.

In 1985, soon after the cancellation of Alien Worlds, Eclipse began publishing a similar science-fiction-themed anthology, Alien Encounters. The title ceased publication in 1987 after fourteen issues.

In 1986,  Blackthorne Publishing published their own one-shot  Alien Worlds, with reprints of stories taken from earlier issues. 

In May 1988, Eclipse issued a standalone, unnumbered edition of the title as part of its Graphic Album Series, featuring all-new stories and art.

Overview 
Nearly all of the stories in Alien Worlds were written by Jones, with only a few exceptions (notably Jan Strnad's "Stoney End" in issue #8 and Frank Brunner's "The Reading!" in issue #9). Jones had developed a skill for the short genre tale, often with a twist ending, during his years with Warren Publishing while writing for their Creepy and Eerie titles.  He was heavily influenced by the horror and science fiction movies of the 1950s, adding graphic violence and sexuality to the mix, complete with copious female nudity; several issues sported a “Recommended For Mature Readers” warning on the cover. For the most part, however, Alien Worlds avoided the more intensely gruesome subject matter of Jones' other Pacific comic, Twisted Tales, which was being published at the same time.

Front covers for the comic were by, among others, John Bolton, Dave Stevens, Frank Brunner, William Stout, and Joe Chiodo. Contributing interior artists included Bolton, Stevens, Al Williamson, Richard Corben, Roy Krenkel, Val Mayerik, and Rand Holmes, as well as two stories written and illustrated by editor Jones himself.

Announced revival series 
In 2010, Bruce Jones and actor Thomas Jane announced they were writing a revival series slated for release sometime in the future.

Issue guide

References

Notes

Sources 
  (Pacific Comics)
  (Eclipse)
  (unnumbered Graphic Album, Eclipse)
  (Blackthorne)

Pacific Comics titles
Eclipse Comics titles
Science fiction comics
1982 comics debuts
1985 comics endings
Comics by George Pérez